The SECR J class was a class of 0-6-4T  steam tank locomotive built for heavy freight service on the South Eastern and Chatham Railway, by Harry Wainwright.

History
The South Eastern and Chatham Railway (SECR) had a need for versatile mixed traffic locomotives which could accelerate quickly so as not to impede the heavy passenger traffic on the densely used lines around London. Following the success of his  C class 0-6-0 and his H class 0-4-4T Harry Wainwright sought to combine their good features but was limited by weight restrictions on many lines. The result was an 0-6-4 tank. Five locomotives were constructed at Ashford during 1913, but Wainwright retired soon afterwards and no more were constructed. The class were moderately successful on a variety of secondary passenger and freight services. All had completed more than one million miles at the time of their withdrawal between 1949 and 1951.

Numbering
The class were originally allocated unused numbers between 126 and 614. However, all but number 597 were renumbered by the  Southern Railway in 1927/8 to create a unified sequence from A596 to A599. These later became 1596–1599, and then 31596–31599 under British Railways.

Locomotive Summary

Sources

External links
 
 

J
0-6-4T locomotives
Railway locomotives introduced in 1913
Standard gauge steam locomotives of Great Britain